Société Omnisports de l'Armée, commonly known as SOA, is an Ivorian basketball club based in Yamoussoukro. The team competes in the Ivorian Basketball Championship and was founded in 1932. The basketball section is a part of the same-named multi sports club.

In 2021, SOA won its first-ever Ivorian championship after defeating ABC Fighters in two games. Asshe Kokoun was named the Most Valuable Player (MVP) of the tournament.

Honours
Ivorian Basketball Championship
Champions (1): 2021

Players

Current roster
The following is the SOA roster in the 2022 BAL Qualifying Tournaments.

References

External links
Official Facebook page

Basketball teams in Ivory Coast
1932 establishments in Ivory Coast
Sports clubs in Ivory Coast
Sport in Yamoussoukro
Basketball teams established in 1932
Military sports clubs
Road to BAL teams